Edward Owen  was the Archdeacon of St Davids from 1831 until 1833.

Owen was educated at Jesus College, Oxford.  He was Chaplain to Robert Jenkinson, 2nd Earl of Liverpool then Curate at Reculver. In 1819 he became Vicar of Chislet.

He died on 21 May 1833.

References

Alumni of Jesus College, Oxford
Archdeacons of St Davids
Church in Wales archdeacons
19th-century Welsh Anglican priests
1833 deaths